The FIBA Oceania Championship for Men 1971 was the qualifying tournament of FIBA Oceania for the 1972 Summer Olympics in Munich. Australia won the series 3-0 to win the first Oceania Championship.

Results

References
FIBA Archive

FIBA Oceania Championship
Championship
1971 in New Zealand basketball
1971 in Australian basketball
International basketball competitions hosted by New Zealand
Australia men's national basketball team games
New Zealand men's national basketball team games
August 1971 sports events in New Zealand